The European Union has two lists of designated terrorist organisations that provide for different sanctions for the two groups. The first list is copied from the United Nations and relates to EU external terrorist organisations, and the second is an autonomous list and relates to EU internal terrorist organisations.

Autonomous list
All other designated organizations.
 the freezing of all funds, other financial assets and economic resources.
 a ban on directly or indirectly making funds, other financial assets and economic resources available.

It is important to note that sanctions are only applicable to EU-external groups regardless of designation. For example, 47 groups are listed as terrorist organizations in the EU but sanctions are only applied to 27 of these. Member States do have an obligation to assist each other in preventing and combating terrorist acts but this is the only action that follows from the designation of an EU-internal organization. 

 European Union list of terrorist groups and individuals, 13 January 2020.

Listing process
New organizations are added to the autonomous list following this process:
 "Designation": Member states and third party states tips about an organization. This state must have solid evidence and must the tip must be sent by the national authority.
 Scrutinity: The Presidency, or a delegation, gathers basic information, and might require more information from the tipping state.
 Consultations: Information is shared with other member states for discussion. Everything is still confidential. 15 days after, delegates of the states meet as the CP 931 Working Party, Europol is sometimes invited too.
 Recommendation: The CP 931 Working Party prepares the listing decision.
 Decision by EU Council: The council adopts the list. The decision must be unanimous, which means that every state has a veto right.
 Official Publishing: In the EU Official Journal
 Notification and Statement of Reason: The council secretariat notifies each designated organization via mail, together with instructions on how to get the decision to be reconsidered.

Delisting process
The EU has similar process to review the list, and to remove organizations for the list.

List of EU external designated terrorist groups

 the list is:

{{columns-list|
 Abu Nidal Organization
 al-Aqsa Martyrs' Brigades
 al-Aqsa Foundation (Al-Aqsa e.V)
 Babbar Khalsa
 Communist Party of the Philippines (including New People's Army)
 Directorate for Internal Security of the Iranian Ministry for Intelligence and Security
 al-Jama'a al-Islamiyya
 Great Eastern Islamic Raiders' Front
 Hamas (Izz ad-Din al-Qassam Brigades)
 Hezbollah (Military Wing) (including the External Security Organisation)
 Hizbul Mujahideen
 Khalistan Zindabad Force
 Kurdistan Workers' Party
 Liberation Tigers of Tamil Eelam
 National Liberation Army (Colombia)
 Palestinian Islamic Jihad
 Popular Front for the Liberation of Palestine
 Popular Front for the Liberation of Palestine – General Command
 Revolutionary People's Liberation Party/Front
 Shining Path
 Kurdistan Freedom Hawks

References 

European Union-related lists
Government databases of the European Union
Foreign relations of the European Union
Terrorist
 
Terrorism-related lists